A or the "transfer agreement" can refer to:
Material transfer agreement, contract governing the transfer of tangible research materials
Copyright transfer agreement, contract for the conveyance of full or partial copyright
Haavara Agreement, 1933 agreement between Nazi Germany and Zionist German Jews concerning emigration
The Transfer Agreement, book by Edwin Black about the Haavara Agreement